Drury Lane is a fictional detective created by Ellery Queen in the 1930s under the byline of Barnaby Ross.  He is a retired Shakespearian actor who lives in a lavish castle on the Hudson River.  His backstory involves leaving the theatre because he lost his sense of hearing, and the novels occasionally mention his lip-reading.  He appeared in four mystery novels: The Tragedy of X, The Tragedy of Y, The Tragedy of Z, and Drury Lane's Last Case.  These books were later reissued under the Ellery Queen byline.  

His name is taken from the name of a London street (see Drury Lane) that eventually became the site of the celebrated Theatre Royal, Drury Lane.

References

Fictional amateur detectives
Fictional deaf characters
Fictional actors